is a Japanese professional footballer who plays as a forward for Hammarby IF, on loan from Chelsea.

Club career 
Hamano made her WE League debut for INAC Kobe Leonessa on 12 September 2021 in a 5–0 victory over Omiya Ardija Ventus.

She signed for Chelsea on 13 January 2023, and was immediately loaned to Swedish side Hammarby IF for the 2023 season.

Career statistics

International

Honours 
INAC Kobe Leonessa
WE League: 2021–22

Japan U16
AFC U-16 Women's Championship: 2019

Individual
AFC U-16 Women's Championship Top scorer: 2019
FIFA U-20 Women's World Cup Golden Ball: 2022

References 

2004 births
Living people
Association football people from Osaka Prefecture
Japanese women's footballers
Women's association football forwards
Japan women's international footballers
Cerezo Osaka Sakai Ladies players
INAC Kobe Leonessa players
Chelsea F.C. Women players
Hammarby Fotboll (women) players
Nadeshiko League players
WE League players

Japanese expatriate women's footballers
Japanese expatriate sportspeople in England
Expatriate women's footballers in England
Japanese expatriate sportspeople in Sweden
Expatriate women's footballers in Sweden